Waga is an area or a cluster of villages in Colombo District, Sri Lanka. Administrated by Seethawaka Pradeshiya Sabha (Divisional Council). It is within the Seethawaka Divisional Secretariat Division. Waga is said to be an area in the Colombo District with a very good climate.

Waga can be reached on road from Colombo via A4 (Colombo - Rathnapura) road, turning off at Kaluaggala junction near Hanwella. The main town and government offices of Waga including the Post Office are located at Kahahena which is 35 km from Colombo. The Waga station of the Kelani Valley Railway Line is also situated at the Kahahena junction. Karandana House, a beautiful and elegant mansion in the area, is situated closer to the Waga Railway Station. The Labugama and Kalatuwawa reservoirs, which supply water to the Colombo city and the forest reserves of Labugama and Udagama are also situated nearby. Ranmudda waterfall is one of the tourist attractions in the area. The distance from the Waga Railway Station to the Seethawaka Wet Zone Botanic Garden is 10.8 km and to the striking railway bridge under which the picturesque stream Wak Oya is flowing is about 0.55 km. 
The Waga Railway station and Kahahena bus station are next to each other.

Majority of the population are  Sinhalese Buddhists. Susiriwardhanaramaya at Kahahena in Waga is a famous temple in the area. The vihara of the temple is well known for the magnificent and extremely serene statue of Buddha and other grand statues of great disciples of Buddha.  Also, there are many splendid paintings in the vihara of the temple.

Populated places in Western Province, Sri Lanka